Madame Aema 6 (애마부인 6 - Aema Buin 6) is a 1992 South Korean film directed by Suk Do-won. It was the sixth entry in the Madame Aema series, the longest-running film series in Korean cinema.

Plot
In this entry in the long-running Madame Aema series, three Aemas are represented: a fourth, a fifth, and a sixth generation of women bearing the name Madame Aema. The fourth generation Aema lives on Jeju Island with her daughter and memories of unrequited love. The fifth generation tries to console the fourth generation Aema, while dealing with her own issues of isolation after declaring herself an independent woman. Sixth generation Aema is undergoing marital difficulties with an unfaithful husband whom she eventually divorces.

Cast
 Da Hui-a: 6th Generation Aema
 Ju Ri-hye: 4th Generation Aema
 So Bi-a: 5th Generation Aema
 Dokgo Young-jae: Hyeon-woo
 Won Seok
 Maeng Chan-jae: Suk-woo
 Sue Young-suck
 Yoo Seong
 O He-chan
 Sin Jin-hui

Bibliography

English

Korean

Notes

Madame Aema
1992 films
1990s erotic films
1990s Korean-language films
South Korean sequel films